Weifang University (WFU) is a provincial public undergraduate and tertiary vocational college in Weifang, Shandong, China. Despite its self-designated English name, the institute has not been granted university status by the authorities but college status instead.

In March 2000, with the approval of the Ministry of Education of China, the Weifang Higher Vocational Training School, Changwei Teachers Vocational Training School, Weifang Radio and Television University, and Shandong Bohai Continuing Education College merged to form Weifang College.

References

External links
Weifang University Official site

Universities and colleges in Shandong